The 1971 South American Rugby Championship was the seventh edition of the competition of the leading national Rugby Union teams in South America.

The tournament was played in Montevideo and won by Argentina.

Standings 

{| class="wikitable"
|-
!width=165|Team
!width=40|Played
!width=40|Won
!width=40|Drawn
!width=40|Lost
!width=40|For
!width=40|Against
!width=40|Difference
!width=40|Pts
|- bgcolor=#ccffcc align=center
|align=left| 
|4||4||0||0||192||15||+177||8
|- align=center
|align=left| 
|4||3||0||1||99||29||+70||6
|- align=center
|align=left| 
|4||2||0||2||105||80||+25||4
|- align=center
|align=left| 
|4||1||0||3||32||144||−112||2
|- align=center
|align=left| 
|4||0||0||4||9||169||−160||0
|}

Results 

First round

Second round

Third round

Fourth round

Fifth round

References

 IRB – South American Championship 1971

1971
1971 rugby union tournaments for national teams
1971 in Argentine rugby union
rugby union
rugby union
rugby union
rugby union
International rugby union competitions hosted by Uruguay